The Open Unified Process (OpenUP) is a part of the Eclipse Process Framework (EPF), an open source process framework developed within the Eclipse Foundation. Its goals are to make it easy to adopt  the core of the Rational Unified Process (RUP) / Unified Process.

The OpenUP began with a donation to open source of process content known as the Basic Unified Process (BUP) by IBM. It was transitioned to the Eclipse Foundation in late 2005 and renamed OpenUP/Basic in early 2006. It is now known simply as OpenUP.

Overview
OpenUP preserves the essential characteristics of Rational Unified Process / Unified Process, which include iterative development, use cases and scenarios driving development, risk management, and architecture-centric approach. Most optional parts of RUP have been excluded, and many elements have been merged. The result is a much simpler process that is still true to RUP principles. 

OpenUP targets small and colocated teams interested in agile and iterative development. Small projects constitute teams of 3 to 6 people and involve 3 to 6 months of development effort.

Known uses 
 The Rochester Institute of Technology uses OpenUP for a class called Introduction to Software Engineering. 
 The Swedish Linnaeus University offers students a collaborative course called ISEP (International Software Engineering Project) in which they heavily use OpenUP. The Dutch HU University of Applied Sciences Utrecht offers several courses which cover aspects of the Open Unified Process as well.
 The University of Minho uses OpenUP for a class called Processo e Metodologias de Software (Software Process and Methodologies).
 The University of Aveiro uses OpenUP for a class named Modelação e Análise de Sistemas (Analysis and Modelling of Systems).

See also
 Rational Unified Process
 Unified Process
 Agile Unified Process

References

External links

Eclipse Process Framework site
Introduction to OpenUP (Open Unified Process)
OpenUP –The Best of Two Worlds

Software development process